Jacob Jagger Cane (born 20 May 1994) is an English footballer who plays as a midfielder for Southern Premier South club Weston-super-Mare.

Playing career
Cane came through the youth side at Exeter City, and was given his first professional contract in April 2012. Five others also were given contracts as youth coach Simon Hayward noted that "the Under-18s this year have probably been the best we've ever had"; the side reached the final of the Youth Alliance Cup in 2012. He made his senior debut for the "Grecians" on 18 September 2012, coming on as an 89th-minute substitute for Tommy Doherty in a 3–2 win over Wycombe Wanderers in a League Two fixture at St James Park. At the end of the 2013–14 season, Cane was released by Exeter City.

After leaving the Grecians, Jacob joined Weston-Super-Mare, and spent the next five season's playing for the club.

On 26 June 2019, Cane joined National League North club Hereford. On 7 November, Jagger-Cane rejoined Weston-Super-Mare on a month's loan The deal was later extended until January 2020. He returned to Hereford on 14 January 2020.

Career statistics

References

External links

1994 births
Living people
Sportspeople from Exeter
English footballers
Association football midfielders
Exeter City F.C. players
Poole Town F.C. players
Weymouth F.C. players
Weston-super-Mare A.F.C. players
Hereford F.C. players
English Football League players
Southern Football League players